The South Branch of the Piscataquog River is a  river located in southern New Hampshire in the United States. It is a tributary of the Piscataquog River, part of the Merrimack River watershed.

The South Branch of the Piscataquog begins at the outlet of Pleasant Pond in Francestown, New Hampshire. The river travels south-southeast until entering New Boston, where it turns northeast to flow to the Piscataquog River just over the town line in Goffstown. For most of its route, the South Branch passes through rolling, hilly country, occasionally dropping over small waterfalls. New Hampshire Route 13 follows the river closely from New Boston to Goffstown.

See also

List of rivers of New Hampshire

References

Tributaries of the Merrimack River
Rivers of New Hampshire
Rivers of Hillsborough County, New Hampshire